The Malta 2021 Stratospheric Balloon was a stratospheric upper-atmosphere weather balloon launched on 13 August 2021 from the Esplora Complex in the small, island-nation of Malta. The launch succeeded an earlier, failed launch in which the balloon detached from its sensory payload due to an imbalance of forces acting on the balloon.

References 

2021 in Malta
Balloons (aeronautics)